The 2015 World Wushu Championships was the 13th edition of the World Wushu Championships. It was held at the Istora Senayan in Jakarta, Indonesia from November 14 to November 18, 2015. Starting with this rendition of the WWC, the top-eight finishing athletes in taolu events would qualify to compete in the Taolu World Cup.

Medal summary

Medal table

Men's taolu

Men's sanda

Women's taolu

Women's sanda

References

External links 

 Official website (Archived)



World Wushu Championships
Wushu Championships
2015 in Indonesian sport
2015 in wushu (sport)
Sport in Jakarta
Wushu in Indonesia